Aulactinia verrucosa, the gem anemone, is a species of sea anemone in the family Actiniidae. It is found on rocky coasts in the northeastern Atlantic Ocean, North Sea and Mediterranean Sea.

Description
Aulactinia verrucosa has a cylindrical body and is wider at the base than at the crown. The walls of the column are covered by wart-like tubercles known as verrucae. Above the column, there are up to forty-eight tentacles, arranged in six cycles. The column is pink or grey, the tubercles grey or white, and the tentacles transparent and banded in pink, grey or olive.

Distribution and habitat

Aulactinia verrucosa is native to the northeastern Atlantic Ocean, the North Sea and the Mediterranean Sea. Its northern limit is Shetland and western Scotland and it is present all round the coasts of Ireland. It is found on rocky shores both in areas with strong currents and in calmer waters. It is present in crevices and in rock pools, often among calcified red algae (Corallina), and also attached to the rock beneath the sediment in rock pools.

References

External links
 

Actiniidae
Cnidarians of the Atlantic Ocean
Fauna of the Mediterranean Sea
Marine fauna of Europe
Animals described in 1777
Taxa named by Thomas Pennant